Frank Parsons Jr. (January 10, 1906 – March 21, 1957) was an American sports shooter. He competed in the 300 m rifle event at the 1948 Summer Olympics.

References

1906 births
1957 deaths
American male sport shooters
Olympic shooters of the United States
Shooters at the 1948 Summer Olympics
Sportspeople from Baltimore